The Jewish arrival in New Amsterdam of September 1654 was the first organized Jewish migration to North America. It comprised 23 Sephardi Jews, refugees "big and little" of families fleeing persecution by the Portuguese Inquisition after the conquest of Dutch Brazil. It is widely commemorated as the starting point of New York Jewish and Jewish-American history.

Brazil 
The Jews had sailed from Recife on the ship Valck, one of at least sixteen that left mostly bound for the Netherlands at the end of the Dutch–Portuguese War. Valck was blown off course to Jamaica and/or Cuba.

Caribbean 
According to account in Saul Levi Morteira and David Franco Mendes, they were then taken by Spanish pirates for a time. In Cuba,  the Jews eventually boarded the St. Catrina, called by later historians the "Jewish Mayflower", which took them to New Amsterdam.

New Amsterdam 
The new Jewish community faced antisemitic opposition to their settlement from Director-General Peter Stuyvesant, as well as a monetary dispute with the captain of the St. Catrina, which required adjudication from the Dutch West India Company. They were aided by some Ashkenazi Jewish traders who had arrived just a month earlier, on the ship Peereboom, from Amsterdam via London. This group included Jacob Barsimson, and perhaps Solomon Pietersen and Asser Levy, who has also in earlier sources been claimed as one of the twenty-three. The new community founded Congregation Shearith Israel still endures as the oldest Jewish congregation in the United States.

The primary source document for their arrival is as follows:

Commemoration
The 250th anniversary of the arrival was marked a year late in 1905, and the 300th anniversary was marked in 1954. The 300th anniversary was marked for an eight-month period, from September 1954 - May 1955. For this milestone, a Jewish Tercentenary Monument and flagstaff designed by Abram Belskie was placed on Peter Minuit Plaza in Manhattan's Battery, and another Jewish Tercentenary Monument and flagstaff designed by Carl C. Mose with a wave-shaped relief bearing illustrations of the Four Freedoms as inspired by Hebrew Bible verses, as well as a conjectural image of the St. Catrina, was placed in St. Louis' Forest Park.

Forest Park monument reliefs-

Obverse:
St. Catrina conjectural image
"Who Shall Ascend into the Mountain of the Lord" (Freedom of worship / Psalm 24)
"Proclaim Liberty Throughout the Land" (Freedom of speech / Jubilee (biblical))
Reverse:
Dove and decorative vegetation
"And None Shall Make Them Afraid" (Freedom from fear / Figs in the Bible)
"For the Widow...For the Stranger...For the Fatherless" (Freedom from want / Deuteronomist)

The 350th anniversary was observed for another one-year celebration from September 2004 - September 2005, with exhibitions at the Library of Congress and the American Jewish Historical Society opening in September and May, and inspired the institution of the first annual Jewish American Heritage Month a year later in May 2006.

References

1654 in the Dutch Empire
Brazilian-American culture in New York (state)
Brazilian-American history
Brazilian-Jewish diaspora
Dutch Brazil
Dutch-American culture in New York City
Dutch-Jewish culture in the United States
Expulsions of Jews
First arrivals in the United States
History of Recife
Jewish-American history
Jews and Judaism in Manhattan
Portuguese-American culture in New York City
Portuguese-Jewish culture in the United States
Sephardi Jewish culture in New York City
Spanish-American culture in New York City
Spanish-Jewish culture in the United States